Bay City Marine Incorporated is a shipbuilder based in National City, California near San Diego.

History

Founded in 1968 (and incorporated in 1971), Bay City Marine has built and maintained vessels for the NOAA, United States Navy and United States Coast Guard.

List of ships built

 Built four of the newer Bay Class icebreaking tugs for United States Coast Guard:
 USCGC Morro Bay (WTGB-106)
 USCGC Penobscot Bay (WTGB-107)
 USCGC Thunder Bay (WTGB-108)
 USCGC Sturgeon Bay (WTGB-109)

A fifth ship, Curtis Bay (WTGB-110), was cancelled and never built.

References

Shipbuilding companies of California
Vehicle manufacturing companies established in 1968
American companies established in 1968
1968 establishments in California